Macchambes "Mac" Younga-Mouhani (born 1 August 1974) is a Congolese former professional footballer who played as a defensive midfielder.

Career

Early career
Younga in the former People's Republic of the Congo, where he started playing football in the streets. He later became a player for Diables Noirs and made his debut as a Congolese international against Chad at the age of 17. His national coach at the time, the German Armin Fickert, was also the one who put him in contact with clubs in Europe and thus enabled him to move to German club Schwarz-Weiß Düren. The Younga family still lives in Düren today.

Younga's career in German professional football began in the 1995–96 Bundesliga season with Borussia Mönchengladbach. However, he only made two appearances there and then moved to Fortuna Düsseldorf, where he was relegated from the Bundesliga after the first season and afterwards joined Fortuna Köln in the following season. It was only in Cologne that he became a regular starter.

Wacker and Rot-Weiss Essen
In early–2001, Younga joined Wacker Burghausen and stayed with the club for four years. During this time, he became a regular for the club and became renowned for his energy on the pitch. With Wacker, he promoted from the Regionalliga Süd to the 2. Bundesliga. He then moved to Rot-Weiss Essen for two years, who also won promotion to the 2. Bundesliga, but failed to stay up in the next year and thus suffered relegation again. Nevertheless, he impressed with Essen, and he became more broadly known when TV presenter Stefan Raab invited him to his show. The reason for this was a spectacular goal in the 2005–06 season against Chemnitzer FC, when Younga waited behind the goalkeeper for him to perform a goal kick, then proceeded to win the ball from him and shoot it into the empty goal. The goal was named "Goal of the Week" by ARD and thus made it into the selection for "Goal of the Month".

Union Berlin
After the relegation of Rot-Weiss Essen, Younga followed his coach Uwe Neuhaus to 1. FC Union Berlin. There he struggled to find playing time in his first season and was temporarily demoted to the reserve team. In the following season, Younga was able to develop into an integral part of the team and make a major contribution to Union's return to the 2. Bundesliga. With Union he managed survival in the second tier for two seasons in a row. However, he was only a reserve player in the 2010–11 season. His foul on VfL Bochum player Matías Concha also caused a stir, as he suffered a broken tibia and fibula. Younga was then sued by Concha for €200,000 in damages, but the Berlin-Tegel Regional Court dismissed the lawsuit in August 2012. At the end of the season, his contract with Union was not extended. He then moved back to the Rhineland to FC Wegberg-Beeck in the sixth-tier Mittelrheinliga.

Managerial career
Since February 2014, Younga has been the under-19 coach of 1. FC Düren.

References

External links
 Macchambes Younga-Mouhani at kicker.de 
Younga-Mouhani's Famous Goal

1974 births
Living people
Republic of the Congo footballers
Republic of the Congo expatriate footballers
Republic of the Congo international footballers
2000 African Cup of Nations players
Borussia Mönchengladbach players
Borussia Mönchengladbach II players
Fortuna Düsseldorf players
SV Wacker Burghausen players
Rot-Weiss Essen players
SC Fortuna Köln players
Expatriate footballers in Germany
Republic of the Congo expatriate sportspeople in Germany
1. FC Union Berlin players
Bundesliga players
2. Bundesliga players
3. Liga players
Association football midfielders
FC Wegberg-Beeck players
Regionalliga players
Oberliga (football) players
People from Niari Department